The Ural Cossack Host was a  cossack host formed from the Ural Cossacks – those Eurasian cossacks settled by the Ural River. Their alternative name, Yaik Cossacks, comes from the old name of the river. 

They were also known by the names:
Russian: Ура́льские каза́ки (ура́льцы) (Uralskiye kazaki (uraltsyo)); Ура́льское каза́чье во́йско (Uralskiye kazachye voisko), Яи́цкое каза́чье во́йско (Yaitskoye kazachye voisko)
Bashkir: Урал казактары (уралец) (Ural kazktaryo (uralets)); Урал казак ғәскәре (Ural kazak ğəskərye), Яйыҡ казак ғәскәре (Yiyok kazak ğəskərye)

History 

The Yaik (Ural) Cossacks although speaking Russian and identifying themselves as being of primarily Russian ancestry also incorporated many Tatars into their ranks.
According to Peter Rychckov some these Tatars called themselves Bulgarians of Khazar origin, and the first Yaik Cossacks, including these Tatars and Russians, existed by the end of 14th century. These Tatars might be both Chuvash people and Mishari (Meschera in Russian, Mişär in Tatar language), the latter had not only Muslims and Jews, but Christians among them to facilitate their merge with Russians Meschera were important on Don as well. Later, as Pushkin wrote, a lot of Nogai joined Yaik Cossacks.
Twenty years after the conquest of the Volga from Kazan to Astrakhan, in 1577  Moscow sent troops to disperse pirates and raiders along the Volga (one of their number was Ermak). Some of these fled southeast to the Ural River and joined Yaik Cossacks. In 1580 they captured Saraichik together. By 1591 they were fighting for Moscow and sometime in the next century they were officially recognized. In 1717 they lost 1,500 men on the Alexander Bekovich-Cherkassky expedition to Khiva. A census in 1723 showed 3,196 men fit for military service.

Yaik Cossacks were the driving force in the rebellion led by Yemelyan Pugachev in 1773–1774.
Their main livelihood was fishery and the taxation on it was a major source of friction between the Cossacks and the state. A revolt broke out in 1772, marked by the murder of General von Traubenberg. Traubenberg headed a commission which was to investigate and settle Cossack complaints and grievances, but his behaviour only antagonized them further. In reprisal, many were arrested, executed and outlawed. Pugachev appeared shortly after and managed to rally them to his cause.

The Yaik Cossacks were renamed as part of the Ural Host after the rebellion.

The Ural regiments later took part in Suvorov's Italian and Swiss expedition, the Great Patriotic War of 1812, the Russo-Turkish War, the November Uprising of 1830 and in the Crimean War. They also played a significant role in the Turkestan campaigns of the 1870s.

In the Ural-Guryev operation of 1919–1920, the Red Turkestan Front defeated the Ural Army, which was formed from Ural Cossacks and others troops which rebelled against the Bolsheviks. During the winter 1920, Ural Cossacks and their families, totaling about 15,000 people, headed south along the eastern coast of the Caspian Sea towards Fort Alexandrovsk. Only a few hundred of them reached Persia in June 1920.

Distinctions
The distinguishing colour of the Ural Host was crimson/red; worn on the cap bands, epaulettes and wide trouser stripes of a dark blue uniform of the loose-fitting cut common to the Steppe Cossacks. Individual regiments were distinguished by yellow numbers on the epaulettes. High fleece hats were worn on occasion with crimson cloth tops. No spurs were worn by the Ural and other cossack hosts. After 1907 a khaki-grey jacket was adopted for field uniform, worn with blue-grey breeches. The astrakhan hats and broad crimson/red trouser stripes of the peacetime uniform were however retained during World War I.

References

Social groups of Russia
Cossack hosts
History of Ural